Bulla occidentalis is a species of mollusc in the genus Bulla.

Distribution
This marine species occurs off St. Vincent, West Indies

References 

 Rosenberg, G.; Moretzsohn, F.; García, E. F. (2009). Gastropoda (Mollusca) of the Gulf of Mexico, Pp. 579–699 in: Felder, D.L. and D.K. Camp (eds.), Gulf of Mexico–Origins, Waters, and Biota. Texas A&M Press, College Station, Texas.

External links
 Röding, P.F. (1798). Museum Boltenianum sive Catalogus cimeliorum e tribus regnis naturæ quæ olim collegerat Joa. Fried Bolten, M. D. p. d. per XL. annos proto physicus Hamburgensis. Pars secunda continens Conchylia sive Testacea univalvia, bivalvia & multivalvia. Trapp, Hamburg. viii, 199 pp
 Adams, A. (1850). Monograph of the family Bullidae. In: G.B. Sowerby II (ed.), Thesaurus Conchyliorum, vol. 2: 553-608, pls 119-125. London, privately published
 Gould, A. A. (1852). Mollusca and shells. In: United States Exploring Expedition during the years 1838, 1839, 1840, 1841, 1842 under the command of Charles Wilkes. Boston. 12: 1-510; atlas 1856: 1-16
 Malaquias, M. A. E.; Reid, D. G. (2008). Systematic revision of the living species of Bullidae (Mollusca: Gastropoda: Cephalaspidea), with a molecular phylogenetic analysis. Zoological Journal of the Linnean Society. 153(3): 453-543

Fauna of the Caribbean
Bullidae